Cyrene is an unincorporated community in Decatur County, in the U.S. state of Georgia.

History
A post office called Cyrene was established in 1894, and remained in operation until 1938. The community was named after the ancient city of Cyrenaica.

References

Unincorporated communities in Decatur County, Georgia
Unincorporated communities in Georgia (U.S. state)